Barron Field (23 October 1786 – 11 April 1846) was an English-born Australian judge and poet.

Early life
Field was the second son of Henry Field, a London surgeon and apothecary, and Esther, née Barron. Barron Field was educated as a barrister, being called to the Inner Temple on 25 June 1814. In 1811 he published an analysis for students of Blackstone's Commentaries (with a second edition in 1817).  He was a great student of poetry and frequently contributed to the press, being for a time theatrical critic for The Times. He became acquainted with Charles Lamb and his circle; Crabb Robinson called on Field in January 1812 and found Lamb and Leigh Hunt there, and he records in another place that at Lamb's house on 23 May 1815 he met William Wordsworth, Field, and Thomas Noon Talfourd.

Judge in New South Wales
In 1816 Field accepted a commission as judge of the Supreme Court of Civil Judicature of NSW, and arrived in Sydney on 24 February 1817. Governor Macquarie, writing to Under-secretary Goulburn in April thanked him "for making me acquainted with Mr Field's character. He appears to be everything that you say of him and I am very much prejudiced in his favour already from his mild modest and conciliating manners, and I am persuaded he will prove a great acquisition and blessing to this colony". Field was soon at work framing the necessary "Rules of Practice and Regulations for conducting the Proceedings of the Court". His salary was £800 a year with a residence, government servants, and rations for himself.

In 1819 he published First Fruits of Australian Poetry, the first volume of verse, although it had only twelve pages, issued in Australia. Lamb reviewed it in the Examiner for 16 January 1820. An enlarged edition appeared in 1823. Though Field carried out his duties ably and conscientiously he does not appear to have been able to keep himself clear from the petty squabbles and jealousies of a small settlement. An echo of this may be found in the description of Field by John Dunmore Lang as a "weak silly man who fancied himself a poet born". Sir Thomas Brisbane, writing to Earl Bathurst in January 1824, stated that Field "had embraced every opportunity of falsely and foully slandering me and my government". But Brisbane could be irascible if he thought his honour or dignity was touched, and his first ground of complaint appears to have been that "during his first two years in the colony, Field had never once entered Government House". However, word was already on the way to Brisbane that Field had been recalled, and Lamb, writing at the end of 1824, mentions that "Barron Field is come home from Sydney. He is plump and friendly; his wife really is a very superior woman". Field had been granted a pension of £400 a year from 4 February 1824.

Field was the editor of Geographical Memoirs on New South Wales (1825) which, among other things, introduced new species of plants, such as Boronia anemonifolia A.Cunn. The abbreviation B.Field is used when citing Field in botanical literature.

Gibraltar and late life
Field accepted the position of advocate-fiscal in Ceylon in December 1828. He was soon afterward appointed judge of the Court of Civil Pleas at Gibraltar. Disraeli called on him there in 1830 and gave an unflattering description of him in a letter to his sister. Field had a disagreement with the Gibraltar Governor, Sir William Houston over the handling of a case involving a Spanish smuggler ship, the Guerrera. In 1836 Crabb Robinson spoke of intending to visit him at Gibraltar, and in 1841 Field printed another small volume of verse, Spanish Sketches, at the press of the garrison library there. In 1844 he was back in England writing to Crabb Robinson from Torquay. He died on 11 April 1846, survived by his wife (who died in 1878), there were no children.

Commentary
Field's claim to distinction does not rest entirely on the fact that he wrote the first volume of verse to appear in Australia, he also founded the first savings bank in June 1819. He is spoken of with respect in Miss Marion Phillips's A Colonial Autocracy. He was the B.F. of one of the most famous of Lamb's essays and the recipient of more than one of his delightful letters, which suggests that he must have had likeable qualities. His verse has little value, but he could do better work in prose and had some claims to be an Elizabethan scholar, his special interest being Thomas Heywood. His Geographical Memoirs on New South Wales, published in 1825, is an interesting collection of some of the earliest scientific papers relating to Australia.

References

1786 births
1846 deaths
Australian people of English descent
Australian poets
Judges of the Supreme Court of New South Wales
Colony of New South Wales judges
19th-century Australian judges